Mohammadiyeh (also Romanized as Moḩammadīyeh) is a village in Montazeriyeh Rural District, in the Central District of Tabas County, South Khorasan Province, Iran. At the 2006 census, its population was 24, in 5 families.

References 

Populated places in Tabas County